Dyschirius devroeyianus is a species of ground beetle in the subfamily Scaritinae. It was described by Burgeon in 1935.

References

devroeyianus
Beetles described in 1935